E0 or E00 can refer to :
 ε0, in mathematics, (epsilon naught), the smallest transfinite ordinal number satisfying 
 ε0, in physics, vacuum permittivity, the absolute dielectric permittivity of classical vacuum
 E0 (cipher), a cipher used in the Bluetooth protocol
 E0 (robot), a 1986 humanoid robot by Honda
 Eo, in electrochemistry, the standard electrode potential, measuring individual potential of a reversible electrode at standard state
 E0, the digital carrier for audio, specified in G.703
 E0, Eos Airlines IATA code
 E0, ethanol-free gasoline, see REC-90
 e0, in demographics, the life expectancy of an individual at birth (age zero)
 E00, Cretinism ICD-10 code
 E00, ECO code for certain variations of the Queen's Pawn Game chess opening
 Enemy Zero, a 1996 Japanese horror video game for the Sega Saturn